The Mutants Are Coming and I Believe They Are of Sound (2000) is a remix album by DJ? Acucrack. All songs originally appear on Mutants of Sound, except for "Time for You to Leave", originally on Nation State EP.

Track listing
 "Hi 420" – 1:01
 "Allegra 420" – 6:17
 "Swollen with 420 Glee" – 6:09
 "Lust in Space 420" – 4:42
 "Nation State 420" – 9:49
 "Bitch Universal 420" – 7:38
 "Road Speed Governor 65" – 2:22
 "Get in Me 420" – 6:05
 "You're Not the Fastest 420 Ship" – 5:25
 "Strobe 420" – 3:11
 "420 Scientists Playing God" – 3:59
 "Time for You to Leave... It's 420" – 5:54

DJ? Acucrack albums
2000 remix albums